Dave Craievich (born May 3, 1971) is a Canadian former professional ice hockey defenceman. Craievich was selected by the New Jersey Devils in the seventh round (143rd overall) of the 1991 NHL Entry Draft.

Craievich played major junior hockey in the Ontario Hockey League (OHL) with the Oshawa Generals. He went on to play ten seasons of professional hockey, including nine seasons in the ECHL where between 1991 and 2000 he played in 516 ECHL games and finished his career with 467 points to rank as the third all-time points leader among ECHL defencemen.

In 2013 Craievich was inducted into the ECHL Hall of Fame.

Career statistics

References

External links

Living people
1971 births
Birmingham Bulls players
Canadian ice hockey defencemen
Chicago Wolves players
Cincinnati Cyclones (ECHL) players
Asiago Hockey 1935 players
Hershey Bears players
Minnesota Moose players
Mobile Mysticks players
New Jersey Devils draft picks
Oshawa Generals players
Utica Devils players
Cincinnati Cyclones (IHL) players
Canadian expatriate ice hockey players in Italy